The Collège communautaire du Nouveau-Brunswick Dieppe Campus is a higher education institution (CCNB) in Dieppe, New Brunswick.

The college is located on College Street and was founded in 1981.

External links 
CCNB Dieppe Campus

Collège communautaire du Nouveau-Brunswick
Education in Dieppe, New Brunswick